The Snake Alley Criterium takes place annually, on Memorial Day weekend, in Burlington, Iowa. The bike race is most famous for riding up Snake Alley, which was named by Ripley's Believe It Or Not as the crookedest alley in the world. The Snake Alley portion of the race includes a  ascent on the  alley and includes five major turns. 
      
This race has been said to be one of the most challenging bicycle races in the Midwest. A national cycling magazine has named the Snake Alley Criterium to be the fifth best criterium in the nation. The race spans over two days, and many of the downtown streets are closed to traffic. The course spans over 15 city blocks.
      
Competitors may include anyone from the age of ten to senior citizens. These age groups however, do not all race in the same event. The Criterium is open to men and women both of which compete in separate races. Prizes vary between $50 for Juniors to $10,000 for the Pro's. Each race has a maximum number of competitors; the smallest group being 50, the largest being 150. The Junior group rides the fewest laps (four), and the Pro group rides the most laps which is a total of twenty-five.  The entry fees are different for each group. The Juniors pay the least amount of money, fifteen dollars, and the Pros pay the most with forty-five. As with any credible bike race, proper safety equipment must be worn at all times.

External links
http://www.snakealley.com/history.html
http://www.traveliowa.com/attractiondetails.aspx?cat=7&id=&destid=449207
http://www.snakealleycriterium.com/SAC%20flyer.html

Sports in Iowa
Burlington, Iowa